The Haq Movement for Liberty and Democracy is an opposition political organization in Bahrain founded in November 2005 with Hasan Mushaima as its secretary general. Several of its leaders were previously in the leadership of the Al Wefaq society, but it also contains others such as Ali Rabea, a secular nationalist and former member of parliament previously associated with the National Democratic Action Society, and Shaikh Isa Al Jowder, a Sunni cleric.

Background 
Haq opposed participation in the parliamentary elections because it considers the 2002 Constitution of Bahrain to be illegal and unilaterally imposed by King Hamad ibn Isa Al Khalifah, replacing the 1973 Constitution.

Haq called on the United Nations on 15 November 2006 to investigate allegations that a secret government grouping has been conspiring to fuel sectarian tensions and rig the results of upcoming parliamentary and municipal elections. In a letter addressed to UN Secretary-General Kofi Annan and delivered to Sayed Aqa, the UN Development Programme's (UNDP) Bahrain coordinator, Haq called for the forming of an international fact- finding committee to scrutinize the claims made in an August report by the Gulf Centre for Democratic Development (GCDD).

The 240-page report, dubbed Bandar Gate after its co-author Salah Al Bandar — a Briton of Sudanese origin who was deported in September to Britain after its publication — alleged that a ring masterminded by a government minister was secretly planning to manipulate the demographic makeup of the country, through the selective granting of citizenship.

Prominent figures of Haq Movement
 Hasan Mushaima (Secretary General)
 Abdul Wahhab Hussain
 Abdul Jalil al-Singace
 Shaikh Isa al-Jowder (Sunni cleric)
 Ali Rabea
 Sayed Hadi Jawad al-Aali
 Abbas Abdul Aziz Nasser
 Layla Khalil Dishti
 Abduljalil Al-Singace, professor of engineering at the University of Bahrain, director of the movement’s Human Rights Bureau, was trialed on 27 September 2011 and received a life sentence.

See also 
 Bandar Gate
 1990s Uprising in Bahrain
 Manama incident

References

External links
 Haq Movement website

2005 establishments in Bahrain
Organizations of the Arab Spring
Political parties established in 2005
Bahraini uprising of 2011
Bahraini democracy movements
Political opposition organizations
Political parties in Bahrain
Politics of Bahrain
Republicanism in Bahrain